The San Felipe Hurricane was the second tropical cyclone of the 1876 Atlantic hurricane season. The storm was first observed east of the Leeward Islands on September 12, later intensifying to a category 3 hurricane while approaching Puerto Rico. In the upcoming days, the storm would make landfall on Hispaniola and Cuba, while also at hurricane intensity. Weakening to a tropical storm, it crossed the island until emerging over central Cuba, and passing just east of Florida. The storm re-intensified into a hurricane and struck near Wilmington, North Carolina as a minimal hurricane. Continuing inland, the San Felipe Hurricane gradually weakened over the United States, reaching near Cape Cod before dissipation on September 19. The San Felipe Hurricane was the only tropical cyclone in the season to result in fatalities, according to records of the season.

Meteorological history
A hurricane was first observed east of the Leeward Islands on September 12, hitting the islands that night. It first passed through Antigua, St. Kitts, and the Virgin Islands.  It strengthened on the next day to become a Category 3 hurricane, and hit Puerto Rico at that intensity on September 13; it entered by Yabucoa and Humacao at about seven in the morning and left the island through Mayagüez at 1:30 local time in the afternoon.

The hurricane maintained this intensity and made landfall on the eastern side of Puerto Rico. Shortly after landfall, the hurricane rapidly weakened to a Category 2 hurricane, then to a Category 1 hurricane after reemerging in the Atlantic. Again maintaining strength, the hurricane made landfall on the eastern tip of Dominican Republic with winds of 80 mph.

Impact
The scientist and scholar Benito Viñes went to Puerto Rico from Cuba to conduct a study to calculate the damages of the hurricane. It was the first hurricane in which a rain gauge was used. San Felipe affected Puerto Rico for ten hours, killing nineteen people.  Although there were 19 deaths reported, historians suspected the Spanish Government withheld the actual damage and death toll data for Puerto Rico. At least two drownings occurred in Onslow County, North Carolina. Flooding, damage to buildings, and uprooted trees were reported from Wilmington. A bridge across Market Street there was washed away.
The storm was called the "San Felipe Hurricane" because it struck on September 13, the feast day of Saint Philip. Exactly 52 years later, Puerto Rico was struck by Hurricane San Felipe Segundo.

See also

Tropical cyclone
1876 Atlantic hurricane season

References

San Felipe Hurricane, 1876
Category 3 Atlantic hurricanes
Hurricanes in Puerto Rico
San Felipe Hurricane, 1876
San Felipe Hurricane, 1876
San Felipe Hurricane, 1876
Gale
Gale